Grand theft auto may refer to:

Motor vehicle theft, a crime in virtually all jurisdictions of the world
Grand Theft Auto, a video game series developed by Rockstar Games
Grand Theft Auto (video game), the 1997 first video game in the series
Grand Theft Auto Advance, also known simply as Grand Theft Auto, 2004
Grand Theft Auto (film), a 1977 film directed by Ron Howard